The following is a list of Radio Disney Music Award winners and nominees for Best Soundtrack Song (also known as Best TV Movie Song, Best Song From a Movie and Favorite Song from a Movie or TV Show).

Winners and nominees

2000s

2010s

References

Soundtrack Song
Film music awards
Song awards